Hydromancy (Ancient Greek ὑδρομαντεία, water-divination, from ὕδωρ, water, and μαντεία, divination) is a method of divination by means of water, including the color, ebb and flow, or ripples produced by pebbles dropped in a pool.

Methods of hydromancy 
There are various methods of hydromancy. With rain water it was termed Hydatoscopy, and with water from a spring it was termed Pegomancy.

The Jesuit M. A. Del Rio (1551–1608) described several methods of hydromancy. The first method described depicts a ring hanging by a string that is dipped into a vessel of water which was shaken. A judgment or prediction is made by the number of times which the ring strikes the sides of the vessel.

A second method is when three pebbles are thrown into standing water and observations are made from the circles formed when the objects strike the water.

The third method described depended upon the agitation of the water, this custom was prevalent among Oriental Christians of annually baptizing that element.

A fourth method used colors of the water and figures appearing in it. Varro stated that many prognostications were made in this way concerning the Mithridatic War. This branch of the divination proved so important that it was given a separate name and there arose from it the divination of fountains whose waters were frequently visited. 

Pausanias (2nd century AD) described the fountain near Epidaurus dedicated to Ino into which loaves were thrown by worshippers hoping to receive an oracle from the goddess. If the loaves were accepted they sank in the water which meant good fortune, but if they were washed up from the fountain it meant bad luck.

A custom of ancient Germanic tribes was to throw newborn children into the Rhine. It was thought if the child was spurious he would drown, but if he was legitimate he would swim. Such a custom appears to be a precursor of the 17th century custom of "swimming witches" perhaps related to the Anglo-Saxon law of trial by water.

In a fifth method of hydromancy mysterious words are pronounced over a glass of water, then observations are made of its spontaneous ebullience.

In the sixth method a drop of oil was let drop into a vessel of water, this furnished a mirror through which wondrous things became visible. This, Del Rio said, is the Modus Fessanus.

The seventh method of hydromancy was cited by Clemens Alexandrinus who cited that women of Germany watched the whirls and courses of rivers for prognostic interpretations. The identical fact was mentioned by J. L. Vives in his Commentary upon St. Augustine. 

In Renaissance magic, hydromancy was classified as one of the seven "forbidden arts," along with necromancy, geomancy, aeromancy, pyromancy, chiromancy (palmistry), and spatulamancy (scapulimancy).

See also
Crystal gazing
Lecanomancy
Psychomanteum
Scyphomancy

References

Divination